Ishmael Wadada Leo Smith (born December 18, 1941) is an American trumpeter and composer, working primarily in the fields of avant-garde jazz and free improvisation. He was one of three finalists for the 2013 Pulitzer Prize for Music for Ten Freedom Summers, released on May 22, 2012.

Biography
Smith was born in Leland, Mississippi, United States. He started out playing drums, mellophone, and French horn before he settled on the trumpet. He played in various R&B groups and, by 1967, became a member of the AACM and co-founded the Creative Construction Company, a trio with Leroy Jenkins and Anthony Braxton. In 1971, Smith formed his own label, Kabell. He also formed another band, the New Dalta Ahkri, with members including Henry Threadgill, Anthony Davis and Oliver Lake.

In the 1970s, Smith studied ethnomusicology at Wesleyan University. He played again with Anthony Braxton, as well as recording with Derek Bailey's Company. In the mid-1980s, Smith became Rastafarian and began using the name Wadada. In 1993, he began teaching at Cal Arts, a position he held until 2014. In addition to trumpet and flugelhorn, Smith plays several world music instruments, including the koto, kalimba, and atenteben (Ghanaian bamboo flute). He has also taught courses in instrument making. His compositions often use a graphic notation system he calls "Ankhrasmation", which he developed in 1970.

In 1998, Smith and guitarist Henry Kaiser released Yo, Miles!, a tribute to Miles Davis's then-lesser-known 1970s electric period. On this album, Smith, Kaiser and a large cast of musicians recorded cover versions and original compositions inspired by Miles's electric music. The follow-ups Sky Garden (released by Cuneiform in 2004) and Upriver (released in 2005) were recorded with a different cast of musicians. Both line-ups featured Michael Manring on bass.

Smith's Golden Quartet (with which he has released several albums) originally featured Jack DeJohnette on drums, Anthony Davis on keyboards, and Malachi Favors on bass. After several iterations, the Golden Quartet now features Pheeroan akLaff on drums, John Lindberg on bass, and Davis on piano.

During the 2000s, Smith recorded albums for John Zorn's label Tzadik, as well as Pi Recordings. In 2008, he and his Golden Quartet released a DVD entitled Freedom Now.

Smith has lived in New Haven, Connecticut for many years, a city where he helped create a prominent culture for creative music.

Discography

As leader/co-leader 

 1972: Creative Music - 1 (Kabell)
 1975: Reflectativity (Kabell)
 1977: Song of Humanity (Kabell)
 1978: The Mass on the World (Moers)
 1979: Solo Music: Ahkreanvention (Kabell)
 1979: Divine Love (ECM)
 1979: Budding of a Rose (Moers)
 1979: Spirit Catcher (Nessa)
 1980: Touch the Earth (FMP)
 1982: Go in Numbers (Black Saint)
 1982: Human Rights (Kabell)
 1983: If You Want the Kernels You Have to Break the Shells (FMP)
 1983: Procession of the Great Ancestry (Nessa, 1989)
 1983: Rastafari (Sackville)
 1993: Kulture Jazz (ECM)
 1996: Tao-Njia (Tzadik)
 1997: Golden Hearts Remembrance with N'da Kulture (Chap Chap, 2020)
 1997: Prataksis (Ninewinds)
 1998: Condor, Autumn Wind (Wobbly Rail)
 1999: Light Upon Light (Tzadik)
 2000: Reflectativity (Tzadik)
 2000: Golden Quartet (Tzadik)
 2001: Red Sulphur Sky (Tzadik)
 2002: The Year of the Elephant (Pi)
 2002: Luminous Axis (Tzadik)
 2003: Organic Resonance (Pi)
 2004: Lake Biwa (Tzadik)
 2004: Saturn, Conjunct the Grand Canyon in a Sweet Embrace (Pi)
 2005: Snakish (Leo)
 2006: Compassion (Meta/Kabell)
 2007: Wisdom in Time (Intakt)
 2008: Tabligh (Cuneiform)
 2009: America (Tzadik)
 2009: Spiritual Dimensions (Cuneiform)
 2009: Abbey Road Quartet (Treader)
 2010: The Blue Mountain's Sun Drummer (Kabell) 
 2011: Heart's Reflections (Cuneiform)
 2011: Dark Lady of the Sonnets (TUM)
 2011: Nessuno with Pauline Oliveros Roscoe Mitchell John Tilbury (IDA 035 – 2016)
 2012: Ten Freedom Summers (Cuneiform)
 2012: Ancestors (TUM)
 2013: Occupy the World (TUM)
 2014: Sonic Rivers (Tzadik) with George E. Lewis and John Zorn
 2014: Red Hill (RareNoise) with Jamie Saft, Joe Morris and Balazs Pandi
 2014: The Great Lakes Suites (TUM)
 2014: June 6th 2013 (Novara Jazz) with Eco D'Alberi
 2015: Celestial Weather (TUM) with John Lindberg
 2016: A Cosmic Rhythm with Each Stroke (ECM) with Vijay Iyer
 2016: America's National Parks (Cuneiform)
 2017: Najwa (TUM) 
 2017: Solo: Reflections and Meditations on Monk (TUM)
 2017: Aspiration with Satoko Fujii, Natsuki Tamura, Ikue Mori
 2018: The Haunt  with Bobby Naughton and Perry Robinson
 2020: Pacific Light and Water/Wu Xing – Cycle of Destruction with Barry Schrader
 2021: Sun Beans of Shimmering Light with Douglas Ewart, Mike Reed
 2021: Sacred Ceremonies (TUM) with Milford Graves and Bill Laswell
 2021: A Love Sonnet For Billie Holiday (TUM) with Jack DeJohnette and Vijay Iyer
 2022: The Emerald Duets (TUM) with Pheeroan akLaff, Andrew Cyrille, Han Bennink and Jack DeJohnette

Compilations
Kabell Years: 1971–1979 (Tzadik, 2004) – collects Creative Music – 1, Reflectativity, Song of Humanity, and Solo Music: Ahkreanvention along with additional material

As sideman
With Muhal Richard Abrams
Young at Heart/Wise in Time (Delmark, 1974)
With Marion Brown
Geechee Recollections (Impulse!, 1973)
With Anthony Braxton
3 Compositions of New Jazz (Delmark, 1968)
Silence (Freedom, 1969 [1975]) with Leroy Jenkins 
Anthony Braxton (BYG Actuel, 1969)
This Time... (BYG Actuel, 1970)
Trio and Duet (Sackville, 1974)
Creative Orchestra Music 1976 (Arista, 1976)
Creative Orchestra (Köln) 1978 (hatART, 1978 [1995])
With Creative Construction Company
Creative Construction Company (Muse, 1970 [1975])
Creative Construction Company Vol. II (Muse, 1970 [1976])
With Andrew Cyrille
Lebroba (ECM, 2018)
With Leroy Jenkins
For Players Only (JCOA Records, 1975)
With Henry Kaiser
Yo, Miles! (Shanachie, 1998)
Sky Garden (Cuneiform, 2004)
Upriver (Cuneiform, 2004)
With Bill Laswell
The stone (2014)With Frank LoweThe Flam (Black Saint, 1975)With Maurice McIntyreHumility in the Light of the Creator (Delmark, 1969)With Roscoe MitchellSketches from Bamboo (Moers Music, 1979)With Matthew ShippNew Orbit (Thirsty Ear, 2001)With Spring Heel JackThe Sweetness of the Water (Thirsty Ear, 2004)
Hackney Road (Treader, 2018) with Pat Thomas and Steve NobleWith John Zorn'50th Birthday Celebration Volume 8 (Tzadik, 2003)The Unknown Masada (Tzadik, 2003)

References

External links
    
 
short film portrait on Wadada Leo Smith, his art and his work with ECM Records
Wadada Leo Smith by John Corbett—BOMB Magazine
A Fireside Chat With Wadada Leo Smith by Fred Jung Posted: 2003-11-29
Henry Kaiser & Wadada Leo Smith – Sky Garden (Review) – Published in The Music Box, July 2004, Vol. 11, No. 7
FMP releases
Art of the States: Wadada Leo Smith Bardsdale'' (1997–1998)
Tawaf  from 2003's "Organic Resonance" on Pi Recordings
Solo performance, July 2000 at SASSAS sound. concert archives
"Wadada Leo Smith: The OFN Interview" by Matthew Sumera: April and June 2005
"Ep. 99: Wadada Leo Smith, trumpeter and composer" by Tigran Arakelyan: May 20, 2020

1941 births
Living people
People from Leland, Mississippi
American jazz composers
American male jazz composers
American jazz flugelhornists
American jazz trumpeters
American male trumpeters
American multi-instrumentalists
American Rastafarians
Avant-garde jazz musicians
Converts to the Rastafari movement
Koto players
American music educators
Nessa Records artists
Pi Recordings artists
Tzadik Records artists
Wesleyan University alumni
21st-century trumpeters
Jazz musicians from Mississippi
21st-century American male musicians
Creative Construction Company members
Leo Records artists
Intakt Records artists
NoBusiness Records artists
RareNoiseRecords artists